Mimi A. R. Koehl is an American marine biologist, biomechanist, and professor at University of California, Berkeley, and head of the Koehl Lab. She was a MacArthur Fellow in 1990.

Education 
M. A. R. Koehl graduated from Gettysburg College magna cum laude, with a B.A. in biology, and Duke University with a Ph.D. in zoology, where she studied with Stephen A. Wainwright. She was a Postdoctoral Fellow at Friday Harbor Laboratories, University of Washington, where she studied with Richard R. Strathmann, and at University of York, where she studied with John Currey.

Research
Koehl broadly studies how body structure and physical environment affect an organism's mechanical function in nature, looking across many levels of biological organization. Scientific techniques utilized in Koehl's laboratory range from fluid and solid mechanics to ecological quadrat sampling.

Selected publications 

Koehl, M.A.R. and M.G. Hadfield. 2004. "Soluble settlement cue in slowly-moving water within coral reefs induces larval adhesion to surfaces". J. Mar. Systems,
Koehl, M.A.R. 2004. "Biomechanics of microscopic appendages: Functional shifts caused by changes in speed". J. Biomech. 37:789-795.
Koehl, M.A.R. 2003. "Physical modelling in biomechanics". Phil Trans. Roy. Soc. Lond. B 358:1589–1596.
Koehl, M.A.R., J.R. Koseff, J.P. Crimaldi, M.G. McCay, T. Cooper, M.B. Wiley, and P.A. Moore. 2001. "Lobster sniffing: Antennule design and hydrodynamic filtering of information in an odor plume". Science 294:1948–1951
Koehl, M.A.R., K.J. Quillin, and C. Pell. 2000. "Mechanical design of fiber-wound hydraulic skeletons: The stiffening and straightening of embryonic notochords". Am. Zool. 40:28-41.
"The Fluid Mechanics of Arthropod Sniffing in Turbulent Odor Plumes", Chemical Senses 2006 31(2):93-105

Awards and honors
The Society of Integrative and Comparative Biology  Division of Comparative Biomechanics has named the annual best student oral presentation the “Mimi A.R. Koehl and Steven Wainwright Award”

 Member of the National Academy of Sciences
 Borelli Award, American Society of Biomechanics
 1990 MacArthur Fellows Program
 Presidential Young Investigator Award, American Academy of Arts and Sciences
 Guggenheim Fellow
 Fellow, California Academy of Science
 Phi Beta Kappa Visiting Scholar
 Rachel Carson Lecture, American Geophysical Union, 2006
 John Martin Award, American Society of Limnology and Oceanography
 Honorary Degree, Bates College
 Muybridge Award, International Society of Biomechanics
 The Graduate School Distinguished Alumni Award Duke University

References

Living people
University of California, Berkeley faculty
Gettysburg College alumni
Duke University alumni
MacArthur Fellows
American marine biologists
University of Washington alumni
Alumni of the University of York
Year of birth missing (living people)
Santa Fe Institute people
American women biologists
21st-century American women